Matinée is the debut album from British singer-songwriter Jack Peñate. It was released on 8 October 2007 on XL Recordings. The album reached number one on the UK Indie Albums chart, and number seven on the UK Albums Chart. It also reached number 74 on the Irish Albums Chart. The song "My Yvonne" features backing vocals by a young and then-unknown Adele.

Critical reception
Matinée was met with "mixed or average" reviews from critics. At Metacritic, which assigns a weighted average rating out of 100 to reviews from mainstream publications, this release received an average score of 53 based on 15 reviews.

In a review for AllMusic, critic reviewer Sharon Mawer said: "Here was a chance to show that the music was worthy. With a singing style in the cockney accent of Lily Allen or Kate Nash, he differentiated himself from these singers by actually playing the guitar himself." At Spin, Jon Young wrote: "Occasionally, you wish Peñate would just calm down already — even the ballads feel a little rushed — but his ordinary bloke vocals and eager hooks never fail to please." Tom Ewing of Pitchfork explained: "everything on Matinée suggests he's a decent guy. But just as you're warming to him he comes out with another one-liner like "no one owns what nature's grown," and you're forced to remember that good men can also make bad records."

Track listing

Charts

Weekly charts

Year-end charts

References

2007 debut albums
Jack Peñate albums
XL Recordings albums
Albums produced by Jim Abbiss